Cestrotus elegans is a species of brachyceran flies in the family Lauxaniidae. It is found in Ethiopia and Morocco.

References

External links 

 
Cestrotus elegans at Systema Dipterorum

Lauxaniidae
Insects described in 1920
Insects of Ethiopia